The pañuelo (from Spanish paño + -uelo) or alampay is a Filipino lace-like embroidered neck scarf or shawl worn around the shoulders over the camisa (blouse). They were square-shaped and were folded in half into a triangle when worn. Pañuelos are the direct predecessors of the Manila shawl.

Description
Pañuelos were traditionally made from sheer lace-like nipis textiles woven from abaca fiber. They were square-shaped and were folded in half into a triangle when worn around the shoulders. They commonly featured floral embroidery (using techniques like calado, sombrado, and deshilado). In addition to the native abacá fiber, they were also made from piña fiber, acquired from pineapples introduced by the Spanish. They also featured borders of lace or knotted fringes, a Spanish element which itself were acquired from the Moors.

They were an integral and distinctive part of the traditional baro't saya ensemble of Filipino commoners and the traje de mestiza ensemble of aristocratic Filipino women (along with the tapis and the abaniko fans), as they brought modesty to the relatively low neckline of the traditional camisa shirts. They were worn in the 18th and 19th centuries but are rarely used today in modern versions of the terno dress.

History
Pañuelos were derived from traditional shawls in the pre-colonial Philippines known as alampay, these were head and neck coverings among pre-colonial Tagalog women. These were carried over into the Spanish colonial period and acquired European design motifs. They were also luxury goods exported via the Manila galleons to Nueva España and Europe, sometimes as gifts to royalty.

Pañuelos were copied by Chinese traders during the 18th and 19th centuries, and sold to the Philippines, Spain, and other Spanish colonies. These copies were made from silk with Chinese motif embroidery. They became immensely popular in the Philippines and were quickly adopted into the local fashions of upper class Luzon women. Similarly, they became widely sought-after luxury exports soon after they reached the Americas, where they became known as the mantón de Manila. They are believed to have influenced later designs of the rebozo of Latin America.

Modern Usage
Since 1930s Pañuelo have been part of Modernized Traje de Mestiza. In modern days Pañuelo can still worn with the Modern Terno especially with older women. Pañuelo or Alampay has been Integral part of Iglesia ni Cristo Church Uniforms worn by Deaconesses in all Locale Congregations in Philippines which is White Terno or called Saya in Filipino that resembles its early Deaconess Uniforms during 1930s. And they can be decorated with Embroidery or having Simple designs.

Gallery

See also

Shawl
Manila shawl
Fichu
Barong tagalog

References

Headgear
Neckwear
Kerchiefs
Shawls and wraps
Spanish clothing
Philippine clothing
Culture in Manila
18th-century fashion
19th-century fashion